Dakpathar, also spelled Dakpatthar and Dak Pather is a small hill town situated in Dehradun district of Uttarakhand, India. It is the location of the Dakpathar Barrage, which forms a reservoir along the town that is popular for recreation. It serves to divert water into the East Yamuna Canal for hydroelectric power production at the Dhakrani and Dhalipur Power Plants.

References

Villages in Dehradun district